Cryptolechia cornutivalvata is a moth in the family Depressariidae. It was described by Wang in 2003. It is found in Jiangxi, China.

References

Moths described in 2003
Cryptolechia (moth)